Aurantimicrobium minutum is a Gram-positive, aerobic, rod-shaped and non-motile bacterium from the genus of Aurantimicrobium which has been isolated from river water from Japan.

References

Microbacteriaceae
Bacteria described in 2015